The apple humble-bee or apple bumblebee (Bombus pomorum) is a species of bumblebee.

Description 
This bumblebee is black with a red tail, an oblong head, and a long proboscis. The male has pale hairs on the collar, scutellum, and first tergite (abdominal segment).

Distribution 
The apple humble-bee is found in western and central Europe and western Turkey, from northern France to the Perm region in Russia, but it is declining and once had a much wider distribution. It has been found once in the United Kingdom, in Kent, but it is doubtful if it ever has been established there.

Ecology 
This species is mainly found in wood-edges and open fields.

References 

Bumblebees
Insects described in 1805
Hymenoptera of Europe